The following tables present the ranks of the Malaysian Armed Forces.

Rank list

Rank table 

This table shows the rank structure and epaulette insignia from 1963 until today. For the ranks in the Malaysian Army, the shoulder board rank insignia for Senior Officers and Junior Officers comprises the medal from the Order of the Royal Family of Malaysia.

Commissioned officer ranks
The rank insignia of commissioned officers.

Other ranks
The rank insignia of non-commissioned officers (NCOs) and enlisted personnel.

Other military-based organization ranks

Royal Johor Military Force 
The RJMF ranks are equal to Army ranks, but different pay grades. RJMF have their own service grade and basic salary scale.

Commissioned officers
The following are rank insignia for commissioned officers for the Royal Johor Military Force.

Other ranks
The following are rank insignia for other ranks for the Johor Military Force.

Malaysia Coast Guard 

Malaysia Coast Guard ranks are equal to the Royal Malaysian Navy's ranks, but the MCG has their service grade and basic salary scale. In addition the MCG does not use the executive curl.

RELA Corps 

RELA Corps ranks are equal to Army ranks, but the RELA Corps has different pay grade. RELA Corps have their basic salary and allowance scale, but RELA Corps have no fixed service grade. Only permanent officer has a salary and allowance like other civil service staff but RELA Corps NCO and lower rank has given an allowance only.

From 2012, RELA Corps rank system was changed and synchronized with the police rank system but still maintaining old insignia.

See also 

 Malaysia Coast Guard ranks
 Royal Malaysian Police ranks

Notes

References 

Malaysia and the Commonwealth of Nations
Military ranks
Malaysian Army